Gore and PerVersion 2 is a re-release of the first album by death metal band Desecration. The album is identical to the band's first album, Gore and Perversion  which was banned on release in 1995.

Track listing
"Raping The Corpse (Desecration)"
"Human Gore"
"Penile Dissection "
"It Can't Be My Grave"
"Dead Bitch In The Skip"
"No More Room In The Freezer"
"Mutilated Genitalia"
"Immense Suffering"
"To Kill With A Drill"
"Pharaonic Circumcision"
"Coprophilliac Connoisseur"
"Fontanelle Fornication"
"I.A.I"

2003 albums
Desecration (band) albums
Reissue albums